M'peti Nimba  (born 25 March 1983) is a Congolese football striker.

Honours
Liga Leumit (1):
2006-07
Toto Cup (Leumit) (2):
2006-07, 2009

External links
 
 

1983 births
Living people
Democratic Republic of the Congo footballers
Democratic Republic of the Congo expatriate footballers
Association football forwards
Hapoel Nir Ramat HaSharon F.C. players
Hapoel Acre F.C. players
Hapoel Ironi Kiryat Shmona F.C. players
Hapoel Petah Tikva F.C. players
Changsha Ginde players
Maccabi Ironi Bat Yam F.C. players
Hapoel Kfar Saba F.C. players
Liga Leumit players
Israeli Premier League players
Chinese Super League players
Expatriate footballers in Israel
Democratic Republic of the Congo expatriate sportspeople in Israel
Expatriate footballers in China
Democratic Republic of the Congo expatriate sportspeople in China
Democratic Republic of the Congo international footballers
21st-century Democratic Republic of the Congo people